The ZB-30 and ZB-30J were Czechoslovakian light machine guns that saw extensive use during World War II.

History 
The Zb 30 and Zb 30J were the later versions of the famous Czechoslovak machine gun, the ZB-26. However, the ZB-30 had some design differences, making it similar to the later ZGB-33, which was an early prototype of the Bren gun. Like the ZB-26, the Wehrmacht adopted the ZB-30 after the occupation of Czechoslovakia, renaming it the MG30(t); it was used in the same role as the MG34, as a light machine gun. In the opening phases of World War II, the ZB-30 in 7.92 mm Mauser caliber was used in large numbers by elements of the German Waffen-SS, who did not initially have full access to standard Wehrmacht supply channels.

Comparison of original ZB vz.26 and modifications:

Note - The ZB 30J was a late design iteration of the ZB 30 for sale to Yugoslavia (originally spelled with a J) that featured an adjustable gas system so that commonly available light and heavy 7.92mm ball ammunition would cycle the mechanism.

Users 

: 2,000 in 7.92mm Mauser caliber shipped in 1938
 : used by the National Liberation Army.

: 3,350 in 7.65mm Mauser between 1932 and 1937, used in the Chaco War
: used as aircraft gun on Kaproni Bulgarski KB-11 Fazan

 Republic of China: Imported and produced under license.
  750 7.92mm Mauser in 1935-1936
 : 400-450 in 7.92mm Mauser ZB vz.30 bought in 1934, used by the Kebur Zabagna

 : 50 in 7mm Mauser, delivered in 1937
: produced under license. Modified to fire the .30 cartridge.
 : used captured Chinese guns.
 : 11 in 7.92mm Mauser received in 1936

 : 5 in 7mm Mauser supplied in 1937
 : 1,257 in 7.65mm, delivered from 1932 to 1938
: Produced under license. 17,131 were imported from Czechoslovakia from 1933 and 10,000 were license-produced at Cugir, with a production rate of 250 pieces per month as of October 1942.
: 20,000 7.92mm Mauser caliber guns ordered but only a few hundred actually delivered. Copied as the Fusil ametrallador Oviedo.
: 9,805 7.92mm Mauser caliber supplied in 1935–1939. Produced under license
 : 80 in 7mm received in 1937
 : 110 in 7mm Mauser caliber ZB-30J received in 1937
: Used by the Việt Minh, supplied by both Nationalist and Communist Chinese
 Yugoslavia: The ZB Model 30J was produced under license as, Пушкомитраљез 7.9mm модел 1937". 15,500 were bought in 1936.

References

McNab, Chris: Twentieth-century Small Arms, Grange Books, 2004;

External links
 Photograph at project-x.org.uk
 ZB vz. 30J photogallery

Light machine guns
World War II machine guns
World War II infantry weapons of Germany
World War II infantry weapons of China
Machine guns of Czechoslovakia
7.92×57mm Mauser machine guns
Military equipment introduced in the 1930s